Frank Sherwin (6 October 1905 – 7 November 1981) was an Irish independent politician who sat for eight years as Teachta Dála (TD) for Dublin North-Central, from 1957 to 1965.

Early life
Sherwin was born in Upper Dorset Street in inner-city Dublin in 1905, son of Christopher Sherwin, a labourer from Dublin, and his wife Mary Jane (née Ford). At the age of ten he witnessed intense fighting on North King Street near his home during the Easter Rising of 1916. He left school at 13, and became an apprentice harness-maker.

As a teenager, Sherwin joined the Fianna Éireann (youth wing of the Irish Republican Army) and participated in the Irish War of Independence.

He took part in the Irish Civil War on the anti-treaty side. He was captured after an attack on Wellington Barracks in November 1922, and badly beaten in custody. As a result, he eventually suffered a stroke and lost the use of his right arm. He was held for twenty months at several detention centres, including Mountjoy Prison, Dublin, and Tintown camp, Curragh, County Kildare. He was transferred to the criminal area of Mountjoy Prison, he was sentenced to twelve months’ imprisonment for allegedly stealing two typewriters. After a personal appeal to the minister for justice, Kevin O'Higgins, the sentence was quashed, and Sherwin was released in July 1924.

He afterwards ran a dance hall, and at one point he operated 27 halls in Dublin city and county.

Politician
Sherwin joined Fianna Fáil in 1926, and in 1939 was elected to the party's Ard Comhairle (National Executive). During World War II he joined the Irish Army as a reserve with other Fianna veterans. He fell out with Fianna Fáil in 1943 after the party refused to nominate him as a candidate for a general election. After a brief flirtation with Clann na Poblachta, he first ran as an independent in 1945.

He stood for Dáil Eireann as an independent candidate in the three-seat Dublin North–Central constituency at the 1957 general election, failing of election with just over 15% of the first-preference vote. One of the successful candidates, Fianna Fáil TD Colm Gallagher, died in June 1957, just three months after the election. This triggered a by-election on 14 November, which Sherwin won.

The constituency was expanded to a four-seater for the 1961 general election, and Sherwin retained his Dáil seat comfortably, winning over 21% of the first-preference vote. However, his vote fell at the 1965 election to less than 6%, and he lost his seat to the Labour Party's Michael O'Leary.

He was a member of Dublin City Council as an independent, from  1955 to 1967 and from 1974 to 1981.

Political views
Sherwin has been described as "colourful". In 1958, when the Dáil was debating allowing women to join the Garda Síochána, he suggested that "while recruits should not be actually horse faced, they should not be too good looking. They should be just plain women and not targets for marriage".

He remained a republican sympathiser throughout his life and wrote in his memoirs in the 1970s that "The Provisional IRA can not be expected to disappear as if they had never fought and suffered". On the Northern Ireland question he wrote, "the solution to the northern problem is for the British Army to get out... The Orangemen would not last a week against the northern nationalists supported by southern government. If the Orangemen did fight it would be a good thing in the long run as it would clear the northern area of foreign bigots".

Dublin's Frank Sherwin Bridge, opened in 1982, is named in his honour.

He married Rosanna Kinsella, of Gardiner St., Dublin in 1937; and they had six sons and three daughters.

References

1905 births
1981 deaths
Independent TDs
Members of the 16th Dáil
Members of the 17th Dáil
People of the Irish Civil War (Anti-Treaty side)
Irish Republican Army (1919–1922) members